"Redshift" is a single by British band Enter Shikari. The song was first played on BBC Radio 1 on 11 January 2016 and released as a digital single the day after. An official video for the song directed by Mike Tyler was released on YouTube the same day.

Track listing

Personnel
Roughton "Rou" Reynolds – lead vocals, synthesizer, keyboards, programming
Chris Batten – bass guitar, vocals
Liam "Rory" Clewlow – guitar, vocals
Rob Rolfe – drums, percussion, backing vocals

Chart performance

References

Enter Shikari songs
2016 singles
2015 songs
PIAS Recordings singles